Tione degli Abruzzi is a comune in the province of L'Aquila in the Abruzzo, region of Italy.

Transport 
Tione degli Abruzzi has a stop on the Terni–Sulmona railway, with trains to L'Aquila and Sulmona.

References